Hiroyuki Oshima may refer to:
 Hiroyuki Oshima (bobsleigh)
 Hiroyuki Oshima (baseball)